Paykino is a rural locality (a village) in Yudinskoye Rural Settlement, Velikoustyugsky District, Vologda Oblast, Russia. The population was 1 as of 2002.

Geography 
Paykino is located 11 km northeast of Veliky Ustyug (the district's administrative centre) by road. Zayamzha is the nearest rural locality.

References 

Rural localities in Velikoustyugsky District